Space Wing or variation, may refer to:

Military
 a military unit involved in outer space, which is a type of Wing (military aviation unit)

United States military
Several units of the United States Air Force involved in outer space duties are designated as Space Wings:
 91st Space Wing (1997-2008) an ICBM unit
 50th Space Wing (activated 1992) a unit of the USAF Space Command
 45th Space Wing (activated 1951) a unit involved in U.S. DOD space launches from Cape Canaveral AFS
 30th Space Wing (activated 1964) a unit involved in U.S. DOD space launches from Vandenberg AFB
 21st Space Wing (re-activated 1992) a unit of the USAF Space Command
 3d Space Wing (1986-1992) a unit of the USAF Space Command
 2d Space Wing (1985-1992) a unit of the USAF Space Command
 1st Space Wing (1982-1992) a unit of the USAF Space Command
 310th Space Wing (re-activated 1997) a unit of the USAF Reserve for Space Command
 341st Space Wing (1997-2008)
 460th Space Wing (re-activated 2001)  a unit of the USAF Space Command

Other uses
 Nissan Diesel Space Wing, a motorcoach
 Astronaut wings, colloquially

See also

 
 Space (disambiguation)
 Space Development and Test Wing (activated 2006) a unit of the USAF Space Command
 Starwing (disambiguation)
 Wing (disambiguation)